Or Nah may refer to:
 Or Nah (Ty Dolla Sign song)
 Or Nah (The Game song)